Palazzo Serra di Cassano is an aristocratic palace in Naples, Italy, built for the wealthy Serra family, one of the original 54 families of the 'old nobility' of Genoa, whose family was organized within an Albergo. The family insignia (crest) is frescoed on the ceiling of the Palazzo Serra's Great Hall. The family had economic interests in banking, insurance and law.

History
The Palazzo is behind the Piazza del Plebiscito on via Monte di Dio, the road leading up to the height of the Pizzofalcone peak. It was built in 1730 by the architect Ferdinando Sanfelice, also responsible for the construction of the nearby Nunziatella, the Bourbon Military Academy founded in the days of the Kingdom of Naples, and still in operation. 

Both the Duke of Cassano and the Palazzo Serra were known throughout Europe for their superb library. In the 19th century, that collection was sold to the 2nd Earl Spencer; the part which he retained is located today at  the John Rylands Library, Manchester. The dual portals of the palace entrance, on the via Monte di Dio, open onto twin curved stairways leading up over an octagonal courtyard. The building originally had entrances on two different streets; the entrance that formerly opened onto via Egiziaca, facing the Royal Palace, was closed in 1799. The owner, Luigi Francesco Serra, The Duke of Cassano (Calabria), closed it to protest the execution (beheading) of his son, Gennaro Serra. Gennaro, the prince of Cassano, fought for the Neapolitan Republic, and was handed over to Bourbon authorities by Admiral Horatio Nelson, who betrayed an agreement he had made with the revolutionaries.

Gennaro Serra's mother Giulia Carafa Serra, the Duchess of Cassano, was also suspected in the revolutionary plot and was banished from Naples for a period of seven years.

The building today houses the Istituto Italiano per gli Studi Filosofici (Italian Institute for Philosophical Studies).

References 

Houses completed in 1730
Serra di Cassano
1730 establishments in Italy